Sweden sent a delegation to compete at the 1964 Summer Paralympics in Tokyo, Japan.  Its athletes finished seventeenth in the overall medal count.

Medalists

See also 
 1964 Summer Paralympics medal table
 Sweden at the 1964 Summer Olympics

References 

Nations at the 1964 Summer Paralympics
1964
Summer Paralympics